Vailathur is a town 4 km from Tirur on the way to Malappuram and it is a junction turning to Valancheri and Malappuram. It also has a road to Tanur in the west side. Vailathur is a ward of Tanur Block Panchayat.

Location
The Thanur road is an easy way to Chemmad as well, which goes through Ittilakkal (via ayyaya road) (Diverting place. The straight road leads to Thanoor and the right turning road leads to Chemmad), Vellachal, Churangara, Pulparamba, Theyyala, Pandimuttam, Velliyampuram, Kodinji and Chemmad. Buses are available through this route. Vellachal, Churangara, Ittilakkal, Thalakkadathur, Kadungathukund, Kuttippala, Karingappara, Tanalur are some nearby small towns.

Transportation
Vaiathur village connects to other parts of India through Tirur town.  National highway No.66 passes through Tirur and the northern stretch connects to Goa and Mumbai.  The southern stretch connects to Cochin and Trivandrum.   Highway No.966 goes to Palakkad and Coimbatore.

 Railway station: Tirur railway station is one of the major railway stations in the Malabar region. Almost every train stops here, connecting the Malappuram district to the rest of the country.
 Nearest airport: Calicut International Airport is approximately 45 kilometres away.
 Nearest towns: Tirur, Kottakkal

Major institutions
 AMLP School Athanikkal, Vailathur
 SC English School, Vailathur
 Thibyan Pre-School, Vailathur
 AMLP school, Ittilakkal

Masjid and temple
 Juma Masjid, Athanikkal-Theyyala road, Chilavil
Town Juma Masjid, Vailathur
 Masjid Al Falah, (In down town)
 Masjid Usman bin Affan, Kavanatuchola
 Kavanatuchola Devi Temble, Naurseripadi
 Mahadeva Temple, Chilavil

References 

Villages in Malappuram district
Tirur area